Aul is a town and the headquarters of Aul CD Block and Aul Tehsil in Kendrapara district in the Indian state of Odisha. It is 17 km from Chandabali. Aul is surrounded by the river Kharasrota and Brahmani on north and south respectively. To its east is Bhitarkanika National Park.

History
Aul has a clear history of establishment.  This state is an outcome of the war between the Suryabanshis and Bhoi Banshis for  the throne of Utkal at Cuttack. The ancestors of Aul raj family belonged to the  last independent king Gajapati Mukunda Deb of Khurda. Gajapati Mukunda Deb  ruled Odisha for a16 years long period from 1559 to 1567. His ancestors were  considered as the feudal chiefs under the Gajapati and before acquiring the  throne he worked there as the  military  chief.

When Gajapati Maharaja Pratap Rudra Deb died  in 1540 his minister played foul and started conspiracy against Kalua Deb  Allias Ramachandra Deb-I and Kakharua Deb alias Purusottama Deb-II, the two  legal sons of Gajapati maharaja. They were killed by him in 1541.

After this incident, Minister Gobinda  Bidyadhar acquired the throne at Cuttack and ruled till 1548. In the meantime  Gobinda's nephew Raghubhanja Chhotray created chaos and attacked Gobinda to get  the throne but could not succeed. During this period Utkal was threatened by the  Afghans of Bengal also. Chakrapratapa became the King from 1548 to 1557 and after Chakrapratap,  Raghuram Ray Chotaraya and Narasimha Ray Jena ruled Utkal till 1559.

In 1559 Mukundra Deb the Army chief of  Gajapati ascended the throne and started his reigning in the name of Gajapati Tailenga  Mukunda Deb as an heir of Chalukya Dynasty.

He fought bravely against the Afghans and  became popular by digging ponds and establishing new villages in different  places of Puri. But the Minister named Janarddan Bidyadhar started treachery  against him. Looking forward to the throne of Gajapati, Janardan  made friendship with the Afghans and dethroned Mukunda Deva by killing him in  the Gohira Tikiri Fort. Janarddan made his son investiture on the Gajapati's  throne in the name of Ramachandra Deb-II.

They approached the Mughal emperor at Delhi but couldn't succeed. Mahanubhab Samarat Akbar sent two  Hindu kings Todar Mall and Raja Maan Singh from his Durbar to Puri to look into  the matter and have a solution. Janarddan tried much to establish Ramachandra  Deb-II as the real Gajapati of Odisha. During the Chandan Yatra time Raja Maan Singh entitled Ramachandra Deb-II as the real Gajapati and offered him the Gaddi Prasad. On the other hand, he divided Utkal into three parts between  Ramachandra Deb-II and other two brothers.

Telenga Ramachandra Deva got Aul killa as his  new Kingdom and Chhakadi Bhramarbar got Patia with Sarangagad fort. From that day Aul came to the front  and prospered with Talenga Ramachandra Deb but always cheeked the Gajapati  rule in Odisha. History says that they were always supported the external  forces and tried to save their state and never cooperated with the Gajapati and  his allies. Folk tale says something older in its story.

The current king of Aul is Shri Braja Keshari Deb. He is the elder son of Late Shri Sharat Kumar Deb.

Education

Colleges
 Aul College, Aul
 Laxmi Barah College, Ayatpur
 Olaver College, Olaver
 Debaray Samarsingh College, Ganeswarpur
 National ITC., Aul
 Gandhi Memorial College, Gobindpur

High schools
 Godabarisha Bidyabhaban, Gobindpur
 C.P.B.E.T. High School, Tunga
 Sarat Kumar Dev High School, Giribandha
 Aul High School
 Samant Singhar Kelu Charan High School, Patrapur
 Panchayat Sitaram Bidyapitha, Manikapatana
 Damodar High School, Ayatpur
 Chakradhar High School, Dahisahi
 Nrusinghajew A.D.M High School, Aragal Sasan
 Namouza High School
 Batipada High School
 Rameswar nial g p high school, chhotanathpur sasan
 G.D. High School, Sanamanga
 Utkalmani Uchha Bidyapitha, Atal
 Mahu High School
 Chandiagari High School
 D.P.S. High School, Padanipal
 Dadhibamanjew Bidyapitha, Desahi
 Manapur High School
 Janata High School, Palimi
 Mohanpur Ganeswarpur High School
 Panchayat High School, Sahira
 S.C. High School, Madhuban
 Janakalyan High School, Kusumi
 Athapatana Binapani High School, Dasipur
 Sahadev Girls High School, Demal
 Ekamania U.G. High Schools.
 Govt. U.G. High School, Chandan Nagar, Kolidiha
 Gopabandhu Girls High School, Hinjal
 Sansidha High School
 Panchayat Girls High School, Desahi
 Mendhapur G.P. High School, Padanpur
 Odisha Adarsh Vidyalaya, Belasarpur, Nial, Aul

Transportation

Road
SH-9A from Jagatpur, Cuttack to Chandabali passes through Aali. It connects it with Pattamundai and Rajkanika on either sides. The Manpur-Singhpur Road connects Alli with Jajpur. Another road connects Aali with SH-35 at Aradi, Bhadrak. It is also has a network of roads interconnecting the villages.

Rail
There is no railway station near to Aul in less than 10 km. However Cuttack RailWay Station is major railway station 87 km near to Aul. A newly constructed rail link from Paradip to Haridaspur is at final stage.

Distance from surrounding towns
 Rajkanika – 11 km
 Pattamundai – 14 km
 Rajanagar - 35 km
 Chandabali- 17 km
 Akhandalamani Temple- 20 km
 Jajapur – 45 km
Kendrapara-35 km
 Bhadrak – 57 km

Health
Aul block has one Community health Center at Aul and PHC(N)'s at Batipara, Dasipur, Govindpur, Mahu, Palimi, Sanamanga.

Law and order
The Court of Judicial Magistrate, First Class was established at Aul in 2011.

Politics
Aul (98) is one of the five Assembly Constituencies of Kendrapara Parliamentary constituency. It consists of Aul and Kanika Block with 315 polling stations and 237969 voters.
 Odisha Vidhan Sabha in 1961 in the midterm election : Raja Sailendra Narayan Bhanjdeo, Aul (INC)
 4th Bidhan Sabha (1967–71) : Dibakar Nathsharma Aul (INC) Total Votes : 73890 Part Won : Congress Votes Secured: 15049
 5th Bidhan Sabha (1971–73) : Sharat Kumar Deb Aul Swatantra Total Votes : 81617  Part Won : Swatantra Votes Secured:
 6th Bidhan Sabha (1974–77) : Sharat Kumar Deb Party: Independent % of Votes: 34.08
 7th Bidhan Sabha (1977–80) : Sharat Kumar Deb Party:  Janata Dal % of Votes: 57.02
 8th Bidhan Sabha (1980–85) : Sharat Kumar Deb Party: Janata (S) % of Votes: 52.00
9th Bidhan Sabha (1985–90) : Dolagovinda Nayak Party: Congress (I) % of Votes: 52.01
 10th Bidhan Sabha (1990–95) : Smt. Sushree Devi Party: Janata Dal % of Votes: 56.61
 11th Bidhan Sabha (1995–2000) : Dolagovinda Nayak Party: Congress(I)
 12th Bidhan Sabha (2000–04) : Pratap Keshari Deb Party: BJD % of Votes: 59.50
 13th Vidhan Sabha (2004–09): Pratap Keshari Deb Party: BJD No of Votes Secured: 61,869
 14th Vidhan Sabha (2009–14): Pratap Keshari Deb Party: BJD
 15th Vidhan Sabha (2014–19): Devendra Sharma Party: INC
 16th Vidhan Sabha (2019–24): Pratap Keshari Deb Party: BJD

Aul Tehsil comes under Kendrapara parliament constituency and the current sitting MP is Anubhav Mohanty.

References

Cities and towns in Kendrapara district